Footlights and Fools is a 1929 American pre-Code film directed by William A. Seiter that was billed by Warner Brothers as an all-talking musical film and released in Vitaphone with Technicolor sequences.

Plot
Moore plays the "dual" role of a French singer in America who was originally an American chorus girl in France to acquire a new persona.

Cast
Colleen Moore as Betty Murphy / Fifi D'Auray
Raymond Hackett as Jimmy Willet
Fredric March as Gregory Pyne
Virginia Lee Corbin as Claire Floyd
Mickey Bennett as Call boy
Edward Martindel as Chandler Cunnungham
Adrienne D'Ambricourt as Jo
Fred Howard as Treasurer (credited as Frederick Howard)
Sydney Jarvis as Stage manager
Cleve Moore as Press agent
Andy Rice Jr. as Song plugger
Ben Hendricks Jr. as Stage doorman
Larry Banthim as Bud Burke
Earl Bartlett as Trio Leader (uncredited)
Nora Cecil (uncredited)

Production background
This film was Moore's fourth film under her contract signed February 28, 1929. It followed Smiling Irish Eyes, also with Moore and directed by Seiter.

Preservation status
This is considered a lost film with only the Vitaphone disks existing.

Soundtrack
 "If I Can't Have You (If You Can't Have Me)"
Lyric by Al Bryan
Music by George W. Meyer
Copyright 1929 by Remick Music Corporation

 "You Can't Believe My Eyes"
Lyric by Al Bryan
Music by George W. Meyer
Copyright 1929 by Remick Music Corporation

 "Ophelia Will Fool You"
Lyric by Al Bryan
Music by George W. Meyer
Copyright 1929 by Remick Music Corporation

 "Pilly Pom Pom Plee"
Lyric by Al Bryan
Music by George W. Meyer
Copyright 1929 by Remick Music Corporation

See also
List of early color feature films
List of lost films

Footnotes
Jeff Codori (2012), Colleen Moore; A Biography of the Silent Film Star, McFarland Publishing,(Print , EBook ).

External links

 Footlights and Fools at TCM Database
 MovieTome
 Answers.com

1929 films
1920s color films
1929 lost films
First National Pictures films
Lost American films
Films directed by William A. Seiter
American black-and-white films
American musical drama films
1920s musical drama films
Lost drama films
1929 drama films
1920s American films
1920s English-language films